Nagaravadhu is a 2001 Malayalam film directed by Kaladharan and starring Vani Viswanath, Sai Kumar, N. F. Varghese, Rajan P. Dev, Jayakrishnan, Baiju, Janardhanan, Spadikam George, Harishree Ashokan, Premachandran and Indrans.

Plot
Sukanya, a young and charming medical student. A shrewd politician named Babuji develops a fancy for her, which leads to the murder of her lover. Babuji orchestrates a fake marriage for Sukanya. She is forced to satisfy the lust of Babuji. But before long, she wins Babuji's trust and steps into the corridors of power and politics along with Babuji. How she takes revenge on Babuji is the crux of the story.

Cast
 Vani Viswanath as Sukanya
 Sai Kumar as Narendra Babuji
 N. F. Varghese as Hrishikesh Parameswaran Nampoothiri IPS
 Baiju as Eby Kuruvila
 Rajan P. Dev as Mamaji
 Jayakrishnan as Harshan
 Janardhanan as Kesari Govinda Pillai
 Spadikam George as DYSP Sadhanandhan
 Harishree Ashokan
 Ponnamma Babu as Akkama Tharakan
 V. D. Rajappan
 Premachandran
 Indrans
 Srividhya
 Mani C. Kappan as Tripathi

Soundtrack
All songs are written by Prabha Varma.

"Chillaattam (female)"	- Sujatha Mohan
"Chillaattam (male)" - Alex Kayyalakkal	
Mehbooba" - Vidhu Prathap, Sujatha Sathyan, Nikhil Krishna, Manu Vijayan	
"Pakalinnu" - G Venugopal
"Pakalinnu (version 2)" - G Venugopal
"Poonthen Nermozhi (female)" - KS Chithra
"Poonthen Nermozhi (male)" - G Venugopal
"Thai Piranthaal (female)" - KS Chithra	
"Thai Piranthaal (male)" - MG Sreekumar

References

External links
 

2000s Malayalam-language films
Films scored by M. Jayachandran
Films shot in Thiruvananthapuram
Films directed by Kaladharan